Peter Neilson (12 July 1954 – 9 February 2022) was a New Zealand businessman and politician who was a Labour Party Member of Parliament in the New Zealand House of Representatives.

Biography

Early life and career
Neilson's father was born in Auckland, but raised in England. Neilson was born on 12 July 1954 in Birmingham, England, and moved to New Zealand in 1958 with his family. He was educated at Glendowie College and University of Auckland, where he graduated with a bachelor of commerce in 1977. He had one son and one daughter with his wife Megan Clark.

He became an economist and later a senior research officer at the Department of Labour.

Political career
Neilson joined the Labour Party in 1972 and stood for the Auckland Regional Authority in the 1974 local elections on a Labour ticket alongside future parliamentary colleagues Helen Clark and Richard Northey. He stood in the Auckland city ward but was unsuccessful. He was later Labour's campaign chairman at the 1977 local elections, chair of the Tamaki electorate committee, Secretary of Labour's Youth Council and Treasurer of the Wellington Labour Local Body Committee.

Member of parliament

In 1983 he was appointed Labour's spokesperson for Employment and Productivity by Labour leader David Lange. He became chairman of a convenor and secretary of a caucus economic committee and tasked with finding methods to leave the then current wage and price freeze in New Zealand.

To commemorate the 50th anniversary of the construction of New Zealand's first state house located in the Miramar electorate, Neilson and Minister of Housing, Helen Clark, carried a coffee table through the same door that former Prime Minister Michael Joseph Savage had done 50 years before. The stunt was referred to as an act of "overt symbolism".

Cabinet minister
In 1984 Neilson was appointed a Parliamentary Under-Secretary to Minister of Trade and Industry during Fourth Labour Government of New Zealand. In Labour's second term Neilson was a member of the New Zealand Cabinet from 1987 to 1990. He was Minister of Revenue, Customs, Works and Development and Associate Minister for State‑Owned Enterprises and Finance. As a minister he privatised the Government Printing Office and State Insurance Company.

Later life and death
After exiting parliament Neilson began a career as a business consultant. He undertook several overseas commissions for Ernst & Young before leaving to become Chief Executive Officer of the Sustainable Business Network.

From 2011 until 2016 he was chief executive of the New Zealand Financial Services Council. He was Chairperson of the Simplicity Charitable Trust, which manages a KiwiSaver scheme in New Zealand. He was also a board member for the National Foundation for Deaf & Hard of Hearing.

Neilson made a return to politics and was a Labour Party candidate in the Manurewa-Papakura ward for the Auckland Council at the  2019 Auckland local elections. He was unsuccessful.

He died on 9 February 2022, at the age of 67.

Notes

References

1954 births
2022 deaths
English emigrants to New Zealand
Members of the Cabinet of New Zealand
Members of the New Zealand House of Representatives
New Zealand Labour Party MPs
New Zealand MPs for Wellington electorates
People from Birmingham, West Midlands
University of Auckland alumni
Unsuccessful candidates in the 1990 New Zealand general election